Tanzania has only played in two Africa Cup of Nations, in 1980 and 2019.

Tanzania is one of Africa's weaker sides and often don't achieve much international honor. This resulted with Tanzania often struggled in qualifying campaign, and outside the first 1980 edition debut, Tanzania had to wait for 39 years before qualified to another AFCON. The national team's records in the tournament is also not impressive, with five defeats and one lone draw dated from their 1980 debut edition, a 1–1 draw to Ivory Coast. The 2019 successful qualification was only the second times Tanzania managed to qualify by their own, although it was mostly helped by lucks thanked for Cape Verde and Lesotho failed to win.

AFCON's records

Tanzania's AFCON matches

Squads

References

External links
Africa Cup of Nations – Archives competitions – cafonline.com

Tanzania national football team
Countries at the Africa Cup of Nations